The 2011 Indonesia Super League U-21 group stage matches took place between 19 January - 17 April 2011 for first group stage and between 26–30 April 2011 for second group stage.

First round 
Group winners and runners-up advanced to the second group stage.

Group 1

Group 2

Group 3

Second round 
All match play in Soemantri Brodjonegoro Stadium. The draw for this Round took place on 21 April 2011 with ties to be played on the weekend of 26–30 April 2011. Group winners and runners-up advanced to the knockout round.

Group A

Group B

References

External links
Indonesia Super League standings (including U-21 ISL)
Profile ISL U-21 Club Participant

group stage